Melony Mincey Bell (born October 29, 1961) is an American politician who is currently a member of the Florida House of Representatives, representing the 56th District which covers the entirety of DeSoto and Hardee Counties, as well as part of Polk County. Bell has served as commissioner for the Polk County Board of County Commissioners, as the mayor of Fort Meade, Florida and as a Fort Meade city commissioner.

Background
Bell was born in Winter Haven, Florida to Ronald and Laverne Mincey. Her family moved to Satellite Beach, Florida when she was young. While in high school, the family returned to Fort Meade, where she met her husband at Fort Meade Middle-Senior High School. Bell earned a bachelor's degree from Southeastern University in Lakeland, Florida and an associate degree from South Florida State College.

Before her career in government, Bell worked as an auditor for the Florida Department of Highway Safety and Motor Vehicles and her husband owns a bee business.

Political career
Bell got her start in politics when she became the lead opposition to the building of a private prison next to Lewis Anna Woodbury Elementary School.  Bell served for 14 years on the Fort Meade City Commission, including four terms as mayor, before her election as a county commissioner in 2010.

In 2017, Bell announced that she would be running for a seat in the Florida House of Representatives in 2018.

References

Living people
Florida Republicans
People from Fort Meade, Florida
People from Polk County, Florida
21st-century American women politicians
People from Winter Haven, Florida
People from Satellite Beach, Florida
1961 births
Women state legislators in Florida
21st-century American politicians
County commissioners in Florida
Florida city council members
Women city councillors in Florida
Mayors of places in Florida
Women mayors of places in Florida
Southeastern University (Florida) alumni